The 2019 season was the Kansas City Chiefs' 50th in the National Football League (NFL), their 60th overall, their seventh under head coach Andy Reid and third under general manager Brett Veach.

In the offseason, the Chiefs released two of their longest-tenured players: Justin Houston and Eric Berry. The Chiefs started the season with a 1–3 record at home, their worst record after four home games since 2012. However, they began the season 4–0 on the road, their best road record after four road games since 2013. With a Week 14 Oakland Raiders loss and a win over the New England Patriots, the Chiefs clinched the AFC West, extending their team record division title streak to four consecutive. They also clinched the franchise's fifth consecutive playoff appearance, one short of the franchise record of six consecutive from 1990–1995. The Chiefs also finished undefeated in the AFC West for the second time under Andy Reid, extending their record within the AFC West since 2015 to 27–3. They clinched their second straight bye to the Divisional round of the AFC playoffs due to a Week 17 win against the Los Angeles Chargers combined with a Patriots loss to the Miami Dolphins.

In the Divisional round, the Chiefs defeated the Houston Texans 51–31 despite falling behind 24–0 in the second quarter to give the Chiefs playoff wins in back-to-back seasons for the first time in franchise history. The 51 points they scored was a franchise record for a postseason game. The win, along with the Baltimore Ravens' loss the previous night, allowed the Chiefs to host the AFC Championship for the second time in franchise history. They defeated the Tennessee Titans 35–24 in the AFC Championship advancing to Super Bowl LIV, where they defeated the San Francisco 49ers 31–20 to win their first championship since Super Bowl IV in 1970.

NFL Top 100

The Chiefs had six players ranked on NFL Network's annual Top 100 players countdown, which was tied for second most in the league. Reigning NFL MVP Patrick Mahomes was ranked 4th, the highest ranking ever by a Chiefs player. Additionally, he was the highest ranked player on the countdown that was not ranked in 2018 and was the second highest player ever that was unranked the previous season.

Staff

Coaching changes

Staff

Roster changes

Players signed
Below are players signed in the offseason through free agency.

Cuts
Below are players who were released during the offseason

Futures contracts
Below are players that were signed as a futures players, which are typically players that have not played in a regular season. These players usually spent the previous season on a practice squad.

Unrestricted free agents
Below are players with expiring contracts that can sign with any team without the Chiefs receiving any sort of compensation. Also included is if the player re-signed with the Chiefs or signed with another team.

Restricted free agents
Below are players with expiring contracts that have three or fewer accrued seasons with the Chiefs that can receive a qualifying offer from any NFL team, the Chiefs can choose to either match the offer or receive a draft pick as compensation depending on the tender placed by the Chiefs which can be 1st round, 2nd, or original round (the pick that was used to draft the player). If no offer sheet is given, the player will receive a one-year contract with the Chiefs for a salary based on the tender placed on the player, $2.879 million for a first, $2.023 million for a second, or $1.323 million for an original round tender. If a tender is not placed, the player becomes an unrestricted free agent.

Exclusive-rights free agents
Below are players with two or fewer seasons of tenure with expiring contracts. If the Chiefs makes a qualifying offer (a one-year contract usually at league-minimum salary) the player has no negotiating rights with other teams, and must either sign the tender with the Chiefs or sit out the 2019 season. If a qualifying offer is not made, the player is an unrestricted free agent.

Trades
Below are any trades that included at least one player. Trades that featured only draft picks being traded for both teams, are listed in NFL Draft section.

Draft

Draft pick trades 
The Chiefs received a sixth round pick in the 2018 NFL Draft and a second round pick in the 2019 NFL Draft in exchange for cornerback Marcus Peters and a fourth round pick in the 2018 NFL Draft.
The Chiefs traded a fourth round pick in the 2019 NFL Draft in exchange for linebacker Reggie Ragland.
The Chiefs traded wide receiver Rod Streater and a seventh round pick in the 2019 NFL Draft to the San Francisco 49ers in exchange for a seventh round pick in the 2019 NFL Draft.
The Chiefs traded their first round (29th overall) in the 2019 NFL Draft, their third round (92nd overall) selection in the 2019 Draft, and a 2nd round selection in the 2020 draft to the Seattle Seahawks in exchange for defensive end Frank Clark and the Seahawks 3rd round selection (84th overall) in the 2019 NFL Draft.
The Chiefs traded a second round selection (61st overall) and their 5th round selection (167th overall) to Los Angeles Rams in exchange for the Rams 2nd round selection (56th overall)

Final roster

Preseason

Regular season

Schedule

Note: Intra-division opponents are in bold text.

Game summaries

Week 1: at Jacksonville Jaguars

Week 2: at Oakland Raiders

Week 3: vs. Baltimore Ravens

Week 4: at Detroit Lions

Week 5: vs. Indianapolis Colts

Week 6: vs. Houston Texans

Week 7: at Denver Broncos

Week 8: vs. Green Bay Packers

Week 9: vs. Minnesota Vikings
{{Americanfootballbox
|titlestyle=;text-align:center;
|state=autocollapse
|title=Week Nine: Minnesota Vikings at Kansas City Chiefs – Game summary
|date=November 3
|time=12:00 p.m. CST
|road=Vikings
|R1=7|R2=3|R3=6|R4=7
|home=Chiefs
|H1=7|H2=3|H3=10|H4=6
|stadium=Arrowhead Stadium, Kansas City, Missouri
|attendance=73,615
|weather=Sunny, 
|referee=Alex Kemp
|TV=Fox
|TVAnnouncers=Kevin Burkhardt, Charles Davis and Pam Oliver
|reference=Recap, Game Book
|scoring=
First quarter
KC – Tyreek Hill 40-yard pass from Matt Moore (Harrison Butker kick), 8:21. Chiefs 7–0. Drive: 7 plays, 67 yards
MIN – Bisi Johnson 4-yard pass from Kirk Cousins (Dan Bailey kick), 2:50. Tied 7–7. Drive: 12 plays, 75 yards, 5:31.Second quarterKC – Harrison Butker 24-yard field goal, 4:34. Chiefs 10–7. Drive: 17 plays, 85 yards, 8:56.
MIN – Dan Bailey 29-yard field goal, 0:06. Tied 10–10. Drive: 12 plays, 57 yards, 1:36.Third quarterMIN – Ameer Abdullah 16-yard pass from Kirk Cousins (kick failed, wide left), 11:51. Vikings 16–10. Drive: 5 plays, 38 yards, 3:01.
KC – Damien Williams 91-yard run (Harrison Butker kick), 6:13. Chiefs 17–16. Drive: 2 plays, 97 yards, 0:48.
KC – Harrison Butker 45-yard field goal, 0:30. Chiefs 20–16. Drive: 7 plays, 39 yards, 2:58.Fourth quarterMIN – Kyle Rudolph 3-yard pass from Kirk Cousins (Dan Bailey kick), 10:59. Vikings 23–20. Drive: 11 plays, 75 yards, 4:31.
KC – Harrison Butker 54-yard field goal, 2:30. Tied 23–23. Drive: 8 plays, 38 yards, 4:05.
KC – Harrison Butker 44-yard field goal, 0:00. Chiefs 26–23. Drive: 5 plays, 19 yards, 1:47.
|stats=Top passersMIN – Kirk Cousins – 19/38, 220 yards, 3 TD
KC – Matt Moore – 25/35, 275 yards, TDTop rushersMIN – Dalvin Cook – 21 rushes, 71 yards
KC – Damien Williams – 12 rushes, 125 yards, TDTop receiversMIN – Laquon Treadwell – 3 receptions, 58 yards
KC – Tyreek Hill – 6 receptions, 140 yards, TD
}}

Week 10: at Tennessee Titans

Week 11: at Los Angeles ChargersNFL International SeriesWeek 13: vs. Oakland Raiders

Week 14: at New England Patriots
{{Americanfootballbox
|titlestyle=;text-align:center;
|state=autocollapse
|title=Week Fourteen: Kansas City Chiefs at New England Patriots – Game summary
|date=December 8
|time=4:25 p.m. EST/3:25 p.m. CST
|road=Chiefs|R1=3|R2=17|R3=3|R4=0
|home=Patriots
|H1=7|H2=0|H3=6|H4=3
|stadium=Gillette Stadium, Foxborough, Massachusetts
|attendance=65,878
|weather=Cloudy, 
|referee=Jerome Boger
|TV=CBS
|TVAnnouncers=Jim Nantz, Tony Romo and Tracy Wolfson
|reference=Recap, Game Book
|scoring=First quarterNE – Julian Edelman 37-yard pass from Tom Brady (Nick Folk kick), 12:34. Patriots 7–0. Drive: 5 plays, 83 yards, 2:26.
KC – Harrison Butker 48-yard field goal, 7:12. Patriots 7–3. Drive: 9 plays, 53 yards, 3:46.Second quarterKC – Mecole Hardman 48-yard pass from Patrick Mahomes (Harrison Butker kick), 13:04. Chiefs 10–7. Drive: 7 plays, 58 yards, 3:56.
KC – Travis Kelce 4-yard run (Harrison Butker kick), 9:33. Chiefs 17–7. Drive: 7 plays, 35 yards, 3:20.
KC – Harrison Butker 31-yard field goal, 0:59. Chiefs 20–7. Drive: 10 plays, 74 yards, 1:49.Third quarterKC – Harrison Butker 31-yard field goal, 8:46. Chiefs 23–7. Drive: 11 plays, 52 yards, 6:14.
NE – Brandon Bolden 10-yard run (run failed), 4:23. Chiefs 23–13. Drive: 2 plays, 19 yards, 0:51.Fourth quarterNE – Nick Folk 29-yard field goal, 11:42. Chiefs 23–16. Drive: 9 plays, 46 yards, 3:25.

|stats=Top passersKC – Patrick Mahomes – 26/40, 283 yards, TD, INT
NE – Tom Brady – 19/36, 169 yards, TD, INTTop rushersKC – LeSean McCoy – 11 rushes, 39 yards
NE – James White – 6 rushes, 33 yardsTop receivers'KC – Travis Kelce – 7 receptions, 66 yards
NE – Julian Edelman – 8 receptions, 95 yards
}}

Week 15: vs. Denver Broncos

Week 16: at Chicago Bears

Week 17: vs. Los Angeles Chargers

Standings
Division

Conference

Postseason

Schedule

Game summaries
AFC Divisional Playoffs: vs. (4) Houston Texans

AFC Championship: vs. (6) Tennessee Titans

Super Bowl LIV: vs. (N1) San Francisco 49ers

Awards and Honors

References

External linksThe Franchise,'' Kansas City Chiefs, May 29, 2019-Feb. 19, 2020 (video). 1: Be Great | 2: It Starts Here | 3: Clear the Way | 4: The Non-Season | 5: A Best Of | 6: Start Your Engines | 7: A Long Time Coming | 8: A Seat at the Table | 9: Kick It Off | 10: Play to the Whistle | 11: Adversity | 12: Next Man Up | 13: Attack Every Day | 14: Recharge and Reload | 15: The Playoff Push | 16: Championship Swagger | 17: Super Bowl

Kansas City
Kansas City Chiefs seasons
Kansas City Chiefs
AFC West championship seasons
American Football Conference championship seasons
Super Bowl champion seasons